Oswald Leo O'Connell (16 September 1884 – 12 July 1960) was an Australian rules footballer who played with South Melbourne and St Kilda in the Victorian Football League (VFL).

Notes

External links 

1884 births
1960 deaths
Australian rules footballers from Victoria (Australia)
Sydney Swans players
St Kilda Football Club players